The Kolkata Mail (via Chheoki) also known as Imperial Indian Mail during the pre-independence era, is a daily train running between two metro cities Kolkata, (Howrah station) in West Bengal and Mumbai, (Mumbai CSMT) in Maharashtra. Numbered 12321/22, the train belongs to the Mail category and is operated by Eastern Railways.

Route

This train travels through Asansol Junction, Gaya, Mughalsarai Junction, Allahabad Chheoki Junction, Katni Junction,Gadarwara Railway Station Itarsi Junction, Bhusaval Junction, Manmad Junction, and Kalyan to reach Mumbai CSMT, and vice versa.

Traction
A Howrah-based WAP-7 hauls the train end-to-end from Howrah to Mumbai CSMT and vice versa, via Gaya.

Before 6 June 2015, this train was hauled by a Kalyan-based WCAM-3 locomotive from Mumbai CSMT to Igatpuri.

History
Kolkata Mail as it is known now is one of the oldest train of Indian Railways with service of 150 years. This train was started by the British Indian Government on 7 March 1870 and was operated by the Great Indian Peninsular Railway. At that time this train was known as the Imperial Indian Mail and use to carry British officers, civil servants, diplomats and their family members from the then Bombay to Calcutta. At that time it was one of the most luxurious train of British India and the world. Later on after independence the name was changed to Bombay Mail, which then subsequently changed to Mumbai Mail after rechristening Bombay to Mumbai. Being a very popular train, Indian Railways has to start another train by the same name but via Nagpur. Later on to avoid confusion, Indian Railways changed its name to Kolkata Mail.

See also
 Dedicated Intercity trains of India

External links
Timetable

Named passenger trains of India
Rail transport in West Bengal
Mail trains in India